Duhla Peak is the rocky peak rising to 1010 m in Zagreus Ridge on Oscar II Coast in Graham Land.  It surmounts Hektoria Glacier to the northeast, and tributaries to Paspal Glacier to the west and southeast.  The feature is named after Duhla Cave in Western Bulgaria.

Location
British mapping in 1978.

Maps
 British Antarctic Territory.  Scale 1:200000 topographic map.  DOS 610 Series, Sheet W 64 60.  Directorate of Overseas Surveys, Tolworth, UK, 1978.
 Antarctic Digital Database (ADD). Scale 1:250000 topographic map of Antarctica. Scientific Committee on Antarctic Research (SCAR), 1993–2016.

Notes

References
 Duhla Peak. SCAR Composite Antarctic Gazetteer.
 Bulgarian Antarctic Gazetteer. Antarctic Place-names Commission. (details in Bulgarian, basic data in English)

External links
 Duhla Peak. Copernix satellite image

Mountains of Graham Land
Oscar II Coast
Bulgaria and the Antarctic